Levey  is a surname. Notable people with the surname include: 

 Andrew S. Levey (born 1950), American nephrologist
 Anton LaVey (born Howard Levey, 1930–1997), American author, musician and occultist
 Brian Levey (born 1984), American soccer goalkeeper
 Edgar C. Levey (1881–1962), American politician from California
 Elliot Levey (born 1973), English actor
 Gregory Levey (born c.1979), Canadian writer
 Michael Levey LVO (1927–2008), English art historian
 Mike Levey (1948–2003), American actor and journalist
 Richard Michael Levey (1811–1899), Irish composer, violinist and conductor
 Santina M. Levey (1938–2017), English costume and textile historian, conservator, and author
 Stanley Levey (c.1914–1971), American journalist
 Stuart A. Levey, American politician and manager

See also
 Levey, Washington
 Levi (surname)